Leslie Mitchell MacPherson (17 May 1880 – 14 June 1941) was an Australian rules footballer who played with Melbourne in the Victorian Football League (VFL).

Notes

External links 

 

1880 births
1941 deaths
Australian rules footballers from Victoria (Australia)
Melbourne Football Club players